Coalition Change 2000 was a political alliance in Costa Rica formed by the Alajuelense Democratic Action and United People.

In the 2002 elections it failed to win a seat, whilst its candidate in the presidential election, Walter Coto Molina received only 0.2% of the vote. The coalition has since disappeared.

References

Defunct political parties in Costa Rica
Socialist parties in North America